Církvice may refer to places in the Czech Republic:

Církvice (Kolín District), a municipality and village in the Central Bohemian Region
Církvice (Kutná Hora District), a municipality and village in the Central Bohemian Region